Mortoniceras is an ammonoid genus belonging to the superfamily Acanthocerataceae, named by Meek in 1876, based on Ammonites vespertinu, named by Morton in 1834.

Mortoniceras is the type genus of the Mortoniceratinae, one of 4 subfamilies in the Brancoceratidae which is part of the Acanthocerataceae (renamed Acanthoceratoidea to conform with the ICZN ruling on superfamily endings)

Distribution 
Mortoniceras is found in middle and upper Albian sediments, at the end of the Lower Cretaceous in Algeria, Angola, Armenia, Belgium, Canada (British Columbia), Colombia (Hiló Formation), Ecuador, France, Germany, Iran, Japan, Madagascar, Mexico, Mozambique, Nigeria, South Africa, Spain, Suriname, Switzerland, Ukraine, the United Kingdom, the United States (California, New Mexico, Texas, Oregon), and Venezuela.

References

Further reading 
 Fossils (Smithsonian Handbooks) by David Ward  
 Studies on Mexican Paleontology (Topics in Geobiology) by Francisco J. Vega, Torrey G. Nyborg, María del Carmen Perrilliat, and Marisol Montellano-Ballesteros

Cretaceous ammonites
Cretaceous animals of Africa
Ammonites of Europe
Cretaceous Europe
Ammonites of North America
Cretaceous Canada
Cretaceous Mexico
Cretaceous United States
Ammonites of South America
Cretaceous Colombia
Cretaceous Ecuador
Cretaceous Venezuela
Albian life
Albian genus extinctions